Greg Amadio (born May 13, 1981) is a Canadian former professional ice hockey defenceman. He is a current defensive development coach for the Sault Ste. Marie Greyhounds of the Ontario Hockey League.

Amadio formerly played for the Hershey Bears when they won back to back Calder Cups in 2008-09 and 2009-10. He also served as an alternate captain during his tenure with the Grand Rapids Griffins. He last played with the Springfield Falcons of the American Hockey League (AHL).

Greg has been actively involved in his older brother Terry's annual Schlitz Open Golf Tournament in Manotick, Ontario, Canada. A tournament that raises money for a variety of local causes.

References

External links

1981 births
Living people
Binghamton Senators players
Canadian ice hockey defencemen
Columbia Inferno players
Grand Rapids Griffins players
Hershey Bears players
Ice hockey people from Ontario
Iowa Stars players
Manitoba Moose players
Memphis RiverKings players
Michigan Tech Huskies men's ice hockey players
Sportspeople from Sault Ste. Marie, Ontario
Portland Pirates players
Springfield Falcons players